Life imprisonment in Canada is a criminal sentence for certain offences that lasts for the offender’s life. Parole is possible, but even if paroled, the offender remains under the supervision of Corrections Canada for their lifetime, and can be returned to prison for parole violations.

A person serving a life sentence must serve for a certain length of time before becoming eligible for parole. First degree murder and high treason carry the longest period of parole ineligibility in the Criminal Code, at 25 years. Parole ineligibility for second degree murder typically varies between 10 and 25 years, and is set by the sentencing judge.

A life sentence is the most severe punishment for any crime in Canada.  Criminal laws are enacted by the Parliament of Canada and apply uniformly across the country.

Mandatory life sentence 
High treason and first degree murder carry a mandatory sentence of life imprisonment with a full parole ineligibility period of 25 years. Previously, in the case of high treason or first-degree murder (where the offender had been convicted of a single murder) offenders could have their parole ineligibility period reduced to no less than 15 years under the Faint hope clause. That option under the Criminal Code is still in effect.

Second degree murder also carries a mandatory sentence of life imprisonment but with a parole ineligibility period of between 10 years and 25 years. Courts will determine the parole ineligibility period based on the gravity of the offence. Contrary to common belief, public safety plays a lesser role given the fact that the offender will be subject to a life sentence and the Parole Board of Canada will presumably assess the present danger posed by the offender at the time of a parole application.

Multiple murders 
An amendment to the Criminal Code passed in 2011 granted courts the authority to issue consecutive life sentences, in effect allowing for multiple periods of parole ineligibility to be stacked and lead to a total parole ineligibility period of greater than 25 years. In the most extreme cases, it authorized a de facto term of life imprisonment without parole (i.e. when the total parole ineligibility period extends beyond the offender's life expectancy).

This provision was used in several cases of multiple murders, with parole ineligibility periods of 35 years (Benjamin Hudon-Barbeau), 40 years (Travis Baumgartner), 50 years (Edward Downey, Emanuel Kahsai and Mark Smich), 70 years (Basil Borutski), and 75 years (Justin Bourque, John Paul Ostamas, Douglas Garland, Derek Saretzky and Dellen Millard, Mark Smich's accomplice (originally 50 years, extended to 75 after sentencing for the murder of his father).

The provision permitting multiple murderers to receive consecutive parole ineligibility periods for the individual murders they committed was struck down by the Supreme Court in R v Bissonette, which held that it authorized cruel and unusual punishment. The Supreme Court ruled that Alexandre Bissonnette, who attacked the Islamic Cultural Centre in Quebec City in 2017 and murdered six worshippers, must nevertheless be permitted the option of applying for full parole after 25 years despite the gravity of the crime in question. The ruling meant that Bissonnette would now be eligible for day parole as early as 2039. All other multiple murderers in Canada were now entitled to similar reductions in sentences.

Other offences 
Offences under the Criminal Code that carry a maximum penalty of life imprisonment in Canada (with a parole ineligibility period of between 7 years and 25 years) include treason, piracy, mutiny, aircraft hijacking, endangering the safety of an aircraft or an airport, endangering the safety of a ship or fixed platform, refusing to disperse after a riot proclamation, arson (disregard for human life), robbery, kidnapping, break and enter with intent, attempted murder, accessory after the fact to murder, conspiracy to commit murder, manslaughter, causing death by street racing, impaired driving causing death, causing death by criminal negligence, killing an unborn child in the act of birth, and aggravated sexual assault.

Under the Controlled Drugs and Substances Act, trafficking, exporting or production of schedule I or II substances also carries a maximum penalty of life imprisonment with a parole ineligibility period of between 7 years and 25 years.

Current sentencing practices ensure that, except in the case of murder, a life sentence is rarely imposed, even when the offender is found guilty for particularly grievous offences. One common exception is cases which involve terrorism-related conspiracies.

As of 2013, 4,800 offenders were serving life sentences in Canada, though only 2,880 (around 60%) were incarcerated (the remainder being on parole). The vast majority of these offenders (about 96%) were serving their sentences for murder. "Lifers" constituted 23% of the federal offender population.

There is no guarantee that parole will be granted to an offender. If the Parole Board of Canada determines that an offender still poses a risk to society, that person may be detained in prison past the parole eligibility period. Any person released on parole from a term of life imprisonment or an indeterminate term of imprisonment must remain on parole, with conditions by the Parole Board.

Dangerous offender 
While life sentences are rare in non-murder cases, the courts may apply a dangerous offender designation in cases involving serious violent or sexual offences. Such a designation may result in an indeterminate sentence with no maximum limit, but a parole review occurs after 7 years and every 2 years after that.

Despite formal parole eligibility after seven years, full parole is rare in cases where a dangerous offender is serving an indeterminate sentence as this provision is reserved for individuals assessed as likely to commit further serious violent offences. In violent non-murder cases involving repeat offenders, it is more likely to be used than a sentence of life imprisonment. As of 2012, nearly 500 inmates had a "Dangerous Offender" designation constituting about 3% of the federal offender population. Three years later, in 2015, 622 federal offenders had a Dangerous Offender designation. Of these, 586 (or some 94%) were incarcerated (representing 3.9% of the In-Custody Population) and 36 were in the community under supervision. This supervision lasts for the remainder of the offender's life.

See: Dangerous offender designation in Canada.

Youth sentencing 

A young person (12 to 17) does not face a life sentence unless they are sentenced as an adult, since the maximum sentence under the Youth Criminal Justice Act is 10 years (for first-degree murder). A person can be sentenced as an adult if they were at least 14 years old at the time of the offence. The crown carries the burden of proving an adult sentence is appropriate and a presumption in favour of a youth sentence always exists, irrespective of the offenders age or the type of offence. Even if the crown does discharge its burden of proving an adult sentence is justified, the period of parole ineligibility for murder is nonetheless different for youths.

See also
 Life imprisonment, worldwide overview

References

External links
 Life Sentences and Section 745.6 of the Criminal Code Department of Justice (Canada)

Canada
Canadian criminal law